Zulfikarpašić is a surname. Notable people with the surname include:

 Adil Zulfikarpašić (1921–2008), Bosnian politician
 Bojan Zulfikarpašić (born 1968), Serbian jazz pianist

Bosnian surnames